The 2022–23 Scottish League Cup group stage was played from 9 July to 24 July 2022. A total of 40 teams competed in the group stage. The winners of each of the eight groups, as well as the three best runners-up progressed to the second round (last 16) of the 2022–23 Scottish League Cup.

Format
The format for the 2022–23 competition was similar to the previous six seasons, however, unlike previous seasons, the group stage was not regionalised. The competition began with eight groups of five teams. The five clubs competing in the UEFA Champions League (Celtic and Rangers), Europa League (Heart of Midlothian) and Europa Conference League (Dundee United and Motherwell) qualifying rounds received a bye to the second round. The group stage consisted of 40 teams: all remaining teams that competed across the SPFL in 2021–22, and the 2021–22 Highland Football League champions (Fraserburgh) and runners-up (Buckie Thistle), and the 2021–22 Lowland Football League champions (Bonnyrigg Rose Athletic).

The winners of each of the eight groups, as well as the three best runners-up, progressed to the second round (last 16). At this stage, the competition reverted to the traditional knock-out format. The three group winners with the highest points total and the European entrants were seeded.

The traditional point system of awarding three points for a win and one point for a draw was used, however, for each group stage match that finished in a draw, a penalty shoot-out took place, with the winner being awarded a bonus point.

The draw for the group stage took place on 25 May 2022 and was broadcast live on FreeSports & the SPFL YouTube channel.

Teams
The teams were seeded according to their final league positions in 2021–22 and drawn into eight groups, with each group comprising one team from each pot.

Seeding

Teams in Bold qualified for the second round.

Source:

Group stage
All times are BST (UTC +1).

Group A

Matches

Group B

Matches

Group C

Matches

Group D

Matches

Notes

Group E

Matches

Group F

Matches

Notes

Group G

Matches

Group H

Matches

Notes

Best runners-up

Qualified teams

Top goalscorers

Source:

References

Scottish League Cup group stages